Centrometopia is a genus of snout moths. It was described by Ragonot in 1887.

Species
Centrometopia atrisparsella (Ragonot, 1887)
Centrometopia interruptella Ragonot, 1887

References

Phycitinae